This article shows the Qualifying Draw for the 2011 Winston–Salem Open.

Players

Seeds

Qualifiers

Lucky losers
  Édouard Roger-Vasselin
  Pierre-Ludovic Duclos

Qualifying draw

First qualifier

Second qualifier

Third qualifier

Fourth qualifier

References
 Qualifying draw

Winston-Salem Open Qualifying
2011 Men's Qualifying